Winn Creek is a  long 3rd order tributary to the Banister River in Halifax County, Virginia.

Course 
Winn Creek rises in a pond about 0.5 miles south of Crystal Hill, Virginia in Halifax County and then flows south-southeast to join the Banister River about 3 miles east of Halifax.

Watershed 
Winn Creek drains  of area, receives about 45.5 in/year of precipitation, has a wetness index of 399.12, and is about 55% forested.

See also 
 List of Virginia Rivers

References 

Rivers of Halifax County, Virginia
Rivers of Virginia